The 2021 South Korean by-elections were held in South Korea on 7 April 2021. The National Election Commission announced on 2 March 2021, that the by-elections would be held for 21 public offices or electoral districts, including 2 Metropolitan mayors, 2 Municipal mayors, 8 Metropolitan Council constituencies, and 9 Municipal Council constituencies. Candidate registration ran from 18 to 19 March, and the list of candidates was confirmed on 26 March.

Voters in the by-elections were able to access early voting from 06:00–18:00 KST on 2 and 3 April. One early voting place was established for each district or county of the region where the re-election was conducted, and voters could vote at any pre-voting place in the district where the re-election was conducted, regardless of their address. But on election day, voters had to vote at their designated polling place, and the voting time was from 6 a.m. to 8 pm.

The election concluded with the mayors of Seoul and Busan, which are the largest city and the second-largest city in South Korea, respectively, being selected via by-election. The two major political parties, the Democratic Party and the People Power Party, were concentrating on these by-elections, as they believed that the outcome would have a great impact on the 2022 presidential election. The Democratic Party's candidate Park Young-sun, endorsed by Kim Jinai (Open Democratic Party) and Cho Jung-hun (Transition Korea), became the unity candidate of the ruling coalition. For the opposition, the People Power Party's Oh Se-hoon became the unity candidate, endorsed by Ahn Cheol-soo (People Party) and Keum Tae-seop (Independent).

Reasons for by-elections 
The reasons and offices (constituencies) for by-elections are as follows:

Metropolitan mayors and governors 
 Mayor of Seoul: Park Won-soon (Democratic), Incumbent died.
 Mayor of Busan: Oh Keo-don (Democratic), Incumbent resigned.

Municipal mayors 
 Ulsan, Mayor of Nam District: Kim Jin-gyu (Democratic), Incumbent was removed from office by judge's ruling.
 South Gyeongsang, Mayor of Uiryeong county: Lee Seon-du (People Power), Incumbent was removed from office by judge's ruling

Members of Metropolitan Council 
 Seoul, Gangbuk 1st electoral district : Kim Dong-sik (Democratic), Incumbent was removed from office by judge's ruling.
 Gyeonggi, Guri 1st electoral district : Seo Hyeong-ryeol (Democratic), Incumbent died.
 North Chungcheong, Boeun at-large electoral district: Park Jae-wan (Independent), Incumbent resigned.
 South Jeolla, Suncheon 1st electoral district: Kim Gi-tae (Democratic), Incumbent died.
 South Jeolla, Goheung 2nd electoral district: Park Geum-rae (Democratic), Incumbent died.
 South Gyeongsang, Goseong 1st electoral district: Lee Ok-cheol (Democratic), Incumbent was removed from office by judge's ruling.
 South Gyeongsang, Uiryeong at-large electoral district: Son Ho-hyeon (People Power), Incumbent resigned.
 South Gyeongsang, Hamyang at-large electoral district: Im Jae-gu (People Power), Incumbent died.

Members of Municipal Council 
 Yeongdeungpo Council, Seoul – F electoral district: Heo Hong-seok (Democratic), Incumbent lost his/her right to be elected.
 Songpa Council, Seoul – D electoral district: Kim Jang-hwan (Democratic), Incumbent died.
 Ulju Council, Ulsan – B electoral district: Park Jeong-ok (Democratic), Incumbent died.
 Paju Council, Gyeonggi – A electoral district: Ahn So-hui (Progressive), Incumbent lost his/her right to be elected.
 Yesan Council, South Chungcheong – D electoral district: Yu Yeong-bae (People Power), Incumbent was removed from office by judge's ruling.
 Gimje Council, North Jeolla – B electoral district: On Ju-hyeon (Independent), Incumbent resigned.
 Boseong Council, South Jeolla – C electoral district: Chung Gwang-sik (Democratic), Incumbent lost his/her right to be elected.
Uiryeong Council, South Gyeongsang – D electoral district: Son Tae-yeong (People Power), Incumbent resigned.
 Haman Council, South Gyeongsang – C electoral district: Kim Jeong-seon (People Power), Incumbent lost his/her right to be elected.

Issues

Amendment of Democratic Party's constitution 
The Democratic Party's constitution states that it cannot nominate any by-election candidates if the party caused the situation that made the by-election necessary. The main opposition party, People Power Party, criticized the Democratic Party's decision, accusing it of revictimizing the women who were allegedly sexually harassed by the late mayor and former mayor. People Power Party interim leader Kim Jong-in said "President Moon is trying to reverse the so-called 'Moon Jae-in article', which was created while he was the party leader", calling on the president to publicly take a position on the envisioned revision of the party rules.

Resignation of Yoon Suk-yeol 

The ruling Democratic Party have been speeding up the creation of a new investigative agency to weaken the power of the prosecution service. This move was followed by the establishment of Corruption Investigation Office for High-ranking Officials. Yoon Suk-yeol, who had clashed with the Moon administration and Democratic Party, publicly opposed the idea of separating powers of investigation and prosecution. Minister of Justice Park Beom-kye said he will gather various opinions from members of the prosecution on establishing an agency that would handle serious crimes. On 4 March 2021, Prosecutor General Yoon Suk-yeol announced his resignation in front of the Supreme Prosecutors' Office in protest against the government's push to weaken the power of the prosecution service. On the same day, President Moon Jae-in accepted the resignation.

Prime Minister Chung Sye-kyun has expressed regret over the resignation. The main opposition People Power Party's interim leader Kim Chong-in said he would meet with Yoon if he wants to. On the other hand, leader of the Democratic Party Lee Nak-yon has criticized Yoon, saying his resignation "out of the blue" was absurd for a public official. But, Democratic Party's approval rating plunged to a record low since the 2017 inauguration of the Moon Jae-in government. Gallup Korea said the decrease in the Democratic Party's approval rating apparently came with its recent conflict with former Prosecutor General Yoon Suk-yeol over creating a new investigative agency to take over the prosecution's investigative powers. Public support for Yoon Suk-yeol rose sharply to take the lead over other potential presidential candidates in South Korea. Some political critics analyzed that Yoon Seok-youl became a big variable in the 2021 by-elections.

LH scandal
A property speculation scandal involving employees in South Korea's top housing agency, the Korea Land & Housing Corporation (LH), emerged in March 2021, becoming a factor in the by-elections. The scandal involved 20 LH workers allegedly acting on insider information to buy undeveloped farmland near a new town development project in the Seoul region since April 2018, before the announcement of the project. There was public uproar as the scandal emerged amidst an ongoing housing affordability crisis in South Korea. Median apartment prices in Seoul have soared nearly 60% since President Moon came into office in May 2017, despite repeated property price cooling measures implemented by the Moon administration. As a result, President Moon's approval ratings sank to 34%, the lowest approval rating of his term after the scandal emerged along with the administration's clash with the prosecution.

Mayor of Seoul

Background

Death of Park Won-soon 
The death of Park Won-soon, the mayor of the largest city in South Korea, was hugely impactful on the 2021 by-elections. This was even more shocking to South Koreans because he was a noted women's rights activist. He fought against authoritarian rule in South Korea and was put in prison in the 1970s as a college student. After becoming a lawyer, he took on many cases related to women's rights. It was his well-known achievement that he won South Korea's first sexual harassment case. So, it was seen as a shock that the person who had been fighting for women rights committed suicide after his female employee accused him of sexual harassment.

Increased attention of female candidates 

Because of the sexual harassment incidents of incumbent mayors, each political party paid attention to female candidates. In December 2020, the majority of the potential candidates in Seoul are women, showing the rival parties' bid to promote themselves as women-friendly. Three women (Na Kyung-won, Cho Eun-hee and Lee Hye-hoon) from the main opposition People Power Party have announced their Seoul mayoral bids.  The possible female candidates from the Democratic side are Minister of SMEs and Startups Park Young-sun and Anti-Corruption and Civil Rights Commission Chairwoman Jeon Hyun-hee. In addition, political parties are considering adding or increasing women's additional points to the primary rules. The Democratic Party maintained the existing 10–25% of the women's additional point, and the People Power Party decided to reflect the women's additional points at 10% in the main primary race and 20% in the preliminary primary race.

Connection between 2011 by-election and 2021 by-election 
In 2011, South Korea held a by-election to fill vacant Seoul Mayor. Mayor Oh Se-hoon who was incumbent from 2006 to 2011 staked his mayoralty on Seoul free lunch referendum. Oh Se-hoon opposed to give free meals to all children, insisting that free lunch policy is "populism", and promised that he will resign if the outcome of referendum is not in favor of his 'selective' policy. However, the referendum which turnout have to be exceed one third of electorate was invalidated by low turnout. Eventually, Mayor Oh resigned on 26 August 2011, as promised and 2011 South Korean by-elections were held in Seoul for his replacement.

Park Won-soon, who become Mayor of Seoul for Oh Se-hoon's replacement, had started as the underdog at the early phase. Then, Independent frontline runner Ahn Cheol-soo who had been a strong supporter of Park Won-soon's famous civic group endorsed him for Seoul Mayor. Thanks to the support of Ahn Cheol-soo, Park Won-soon overtaken Na Kyung-won, the frontline runner of the ruling Grand National Party, in a poll.

On 27 September 2011, Na Kyung-won who worked as the GNP's spokeswoman from 2006 to 2008 was nominated as the GNP candidate. Meanwhile, the opposition coalition unified the candidate. Independent candidate Park Won-soon, Democratic candidate Park Young-sun and Democratic Labor candidate Choi Gyu-yeop participated in the candidate unification primary, and Park Won-soon won the primary and became the nominee of the opposition coalition. On 26 October 2011, Park Won-soon was elected by 7.19%, winning 53.40% of the votes. On the other hand, Na Kyung-won won 46.21% of the votes and become second place. So, there is a saying that it is similar to the 2011 by-election in that Park Young-sun, Na Kyung-won, Oh Se-hoon, and Ahn Chul-soo, who were involved in the 2011 mayoral by-election, are running for the Seoul mayoral by-election in 2021.

Registered candidates

Candidate unification 
 

 

Because of first past the post voting, South Korean politicians often try 'candidate unification' by opinion polls not to split the voters of their side. In 2021 Seoul mayoral by-election, People Power Party, People's Party and Independent candidate Keum Tae-seop agreed to unify their candidacy. According to the procedure they agreed on, in the first phase, the independent Keum Tae-seop and the People's Party unites their candidacy, and the winner of the first stage unify with the People Power Party candidate in the second stage. Meanwhile, the ruling Democratic Party proposed unification to Open Democratic Party and Transition Korea. The candidates of each party expressed their stance in favor of the candidate unification.

As opposition coalition had announced their unified candidate on 23 March 2021, Seoul mayoral by-election became a two-way race between the pan-liberal candidate Park Young-sun and the pan-opposition candidate Oh Se-hoon.

Ruling coalition 
Open Democratic Party candidate Kim Jin-ae announced her resignation from the National Assembly to run for Seoul Mayor on 2 March 2021, and demanded fair unification rule to the Democratic Party and their candidate Park Young-sun. Candidate Kim insisted on debating three times for unification, but the Democratic Party that worried about running out of time to promote their candidate balked at this idea.

On 8 March 2021, Democratic candidate Park Young-sun won the 1st round of candidate unification primary against Transition Korea candidate Cho Jung-hun. Details of the poll results were not released to the public.

On 17 March 2021, Park Young-sun defeated Open Democratic Party candidate Kim Jin-ae in 2nd round of unification primary.

Opposition coalition 
On 4 February 2021, People Party Ahn Cheol-soo and Independent Keum Tae-seop began to discuss the details of their unification. Both sides agreed to hold a TV debate on 18 February, but there were some conflict over the details. In the debate, Ahn and Keum clashed over annual LGBTQ Pride parade. Keum Tae-seop asked Ahn if he would be willing to participate on Pride parade if elected as the mayor of Seoul. Ahn Cheol-soo opposed annual Pride parade in the Gwanghwamun area, saying "If we hold the Queer Festival in the Gwanghwamun area, there will be people voluntarily coming to see the festival there, but there are also others who have to be in the area for other reasons or who visit with their children. Their rights to refuse such things should be respected as well." Keum criticized Ahn's remarks in a radio interview the following day, saying he was disappointed as they lacked consideration for the basic human rights of the LGBTQ community. And the progressive Justice Party's Sexual Minority Committee criticized Ahn's view and demand an apology for LGBTQ people, stating "It is an open repression and oppression against LGBTQ people by who do not view LGBTQ as fellow citizens"

On 1 March 2021, Ahn Cheol-soo won the 1st round of candidate unification primary. Details of the poll results were withheld in accordance with the National Election Commission's guidelines. After that, Oh Se-hoon and Ahn Cheol-soo have met and discussed on the unification process. They said both sides agreed on the need to field a unified candidate and that it would be desirable to do so before the candidate registration period expires. On 16 March 2021, Ahn Cheol-soo said that he will seek to merge the People Party with People Power Party regardless of whether he defeats Oh Se-hoon in a unification primary. Ahn hoped his plan would help ease concerns that he would abandon the PPP after becoming the unified candidate and launch a third party with former Prosecutor General Yoon Seok-youl, who is one of the leading potential 2022 presidential candidate. But, on 18 March, the People Power Party and People's Party announced that they failed to make an agreement of procedures and other details before the registration period ends on 19 March.

On 19 March, Ahn Cheol-soo announced that he would accept the PPP's conditions. But, on the same day, Oh Se-hoon pointed out that it has not been clarified as to what degree Ahn is willing to accept, and raised an issue with remarks by the People's Party secretary general, who said the percentage of landline phone survey results will be negotiated and the survey will include questions on who is a better candidate in terms of competitiveness. The PPP had demanded 10 percent of the poll should be conducted through landline telephones and Ahn was known to have demanded the poll should only ask "competitiveness" of the candidates, not "adequacy". Eventually, Oh Se-hoon and Ahn Cheol-soo held a separate press conference at the same time on the same day. Oh Se-hoon announced that he will accept the Ahn's demand that all votes in the primary be cast via mobile phones and Ahn also announced that he will accept the PPP's demands on landline telephones. Some view this strange concession as a strategy to woo more voters to their side.

On 23 March, both campaigns jointly announced Oh Se-hoon's victory from two mobile surveys of a total 3,200 Seoul residents that evaluated the candidates' adequacy and competitiveness. Ahn Cheol-soo said he accepts the outcome, before vowing to work hard to help the unified opposition bloc win the election. Park Young-sun called Oh Se-hoon an outdated mayor who failed, while referring to herself as a mayor for the future.

Primary and Nomination

Democratic Party 
Democrats are worried about by-elections as two metropolitan mayors of their party dead or resigned due to sexual allegations. The fact of the incident can not be confirmed as the investigation become impossible by death of Mayor Park, but it was said that it would be very disadvantageous to the Democratic Party. Moreover, since Seoul and Busan are the first and second cities in South Korea by population, one of the biggest concerns of the Democratic Party is that this by-election which will be unfavorable to them may affect the 2022 presidential election.

On 1 March 2021, Former Minister of SMEs and Startups Park Young-sun won the primary and become the Democratic Party nominee in 2021 Seoul mayoral by-election, defeating Assemblyman Woo Sang-ho. 

 Park Young-sun, Former Minister of SMEs and Startups (2019–2021) – (Nominated)
Woo Sang-ho, Former Floor Leader of the Democratic Party in the National Assembly

People Power Party 
On 4 March 2021, People Power Party announced the result and the winner of the primary. Former Seoul Mayor Oh Se-hoon was selected as the People Power Party's candidate to run 2021 Seoul mayoral by-election. Oh Se-hoon won 41.64 percent of the support and his primary rival Na Kyung-won won 36.31 percent.

Oh Se-hoon, Former Mayor of Seoul (2006–2011) – (Nominated)
Oh Shin-hwan, Former Member of the National Assembly (2015–2020)
Na Kyung-won, Former Floor Leader of the Liberty Korea Party in the National Assembly
Cho Eun-hee, Mayor of Seocho District (2018–present)
Lee Hye-hoon, Former Member of the National Assembly (withdrawn)
Kim Geun-sik (eliminated)
Kim Seon-dong, Former Secretary-General of the People Power Party (eliminated) 
Lee Seong-hyeon (eliminated) 
Lee Jong-gu (eliminated)

Justice Party 
On , Justice Party decided not to field candidates in the April mayoral by-elections after its leader was expelled for a sexual abuse scandal.

People's Party
 Ahn Cheol-soo, Chairman of the People's Party

Open Democratic Party
Kim Jin-ae was nominated as the candidate of Open Democratic Party on 9 February 2021. The Open Democratic Party announced on same day that Kim Jin-ae received 3660 votes (66.3%) out of the total number of votes 5518 in the primary, overtaking former lawmaker Chung Bong-ju. Chung Bong-ju won 1858 votes (33.7%).
 Kim Jin-ae, Member of the National Assembly – (nominated)
 Chung Bong-ju, Former Member of the National Assembly

Other parties 
 Basic Income Party: Shin Ji-hye, Leader of the Basic Income Party, not to be confused with Green Party Korea's Shin Jiye, 2018 Seoul mayoral election candidate.
 Transition Korea: Cho Jung-hun, President of the Transition Korea
Misaeng Party: Chung Dong-hui, writer
 Progressive Party: Song Myeong-suk, Co-Leader of the Progressive Party
 National Revolutionary Dividends Party: Huh Kyung-young, President of the National Revolutionary Dividends Party
 Our Future: Oh Tae-yang, President of the Our Future
 Women's Party: Kim Jin-ah, Co-Leader of the Women's Party

Independents 
 Kim Dae-ho, Director of Social Design Research Institute
Keum Tae-seop, Former Member of the National Assembly
Shin Ji-ye, 2018 Green Party Korea candidate for Seoul Mayor

Debates

Major candidates 

During the first televised debate, both candidate clashed with real estate issues and Moon Jae-in administration's anti-speculative policies amid LH scandal. Park Young-sun raised allegations against Oh Se-hoon that he received 3.65 billion KRW in 2009 in compensation for land in Seoul's Seocho district, after his involvement in the area being designated a residential zone. Oh Se-hoon denied that he was aware of the land under his wife's name or the development plan. Oh Se-hoon then attacked Moon administration's housing policies aimed at curbing soaring housing prices, saying the government policies have only served to exacerbate the problem and start a vicious economic cycle. Park Young-sun acknowledged some failure in the policies and said she will introduce new measures.

During the second debate, Park Young-sun continued interrogating Oh Se-hoon on the suspicion of his land compensation. Park argued that Oh should have known as the mayor at that time. She also pointed out that the residences of then President Lee Myung-bak and his brother Lee Sang-deuk, then a ruling party politician, were located nearby and raised suspicions that the decision to develop the area was also aimed at benefiting them. Oh denied again her claim, saying the decision was made by the director-general of Seoul at that time, not him. He said there's no need to be briefed to him, because the housing plan had been discussed since he become Seoul Mayor. Oh then criticized Park over the controversy that she and her husband purchased a residence in Tokyo, to which Park responded by accusing him of raising it to divert attention away from the suspicions directed at him.

The last debate were held on Monday, 5 April 2021, by Korea Broadcasting Journalists Club. Oh Se-hoon criticized that Park Young-sun's housing plans are unrealistic and unachievable. Park Young-sun argued during the debate that he lied about the controversial land development project, which allegedly benefited his wife and her family. Then, Oh said Park's candidacy itself is a lie by the ruling party, which had promised not to produce a candidate for a by-election made necessary due to its elected members' indiscretion while in office.

Minor candidates

Polling

Exit poll

Young voters, who have traditionally sided with the Democratic Party, voted for the conservative PPP according to the Seoul exit polls. PPP's Oh Se-hoon won by a margin of 55.3 percent to 34.1 percent among voters in their 20s, and 56.5 percent to 38.7 percent among voters in their 30s. Among male voters in their 20s, Oh received a staggering 72.5 percent support in the exit poll. This swing among young voters to the PPP was attributed to the Moon government's left-leaning real estate policies, such as tightening of borrowing rules and raising various home-related taxes, affecting young people who wish to buy a home of their own. More importantly, the Democratic Party's continued support for feminism and women-prioritized policies had caused severe social divisions between young men and women, which prompted male 20s to vote for the conservative Oh. The PPP's Lee Junseok and Ha Taekyoung's role in promoting social unity amongst males and females while giving voice to the male 20s played a critical role. The Democratic administration was perceived to be of double standards, as seen in the alleged meddling of former Justice Minister Cho Kuk and his wife in their children's school admissions, sexual harassment cases of both former Seoul and Busan mayors affiliated with the ruling party, and the Democrats' decision to field candidates against its internal rule prohibiting competing in by-elections caused by "serious wrongdoing" by its members and seen as a critical factor in the Democrats losing support from young voters.

Park Young-sun's comment that young people had a weak sense and experience of history after the release of weak poll numbers among young voters was said to have backfired on the DP. In contrast, Oh embraced the youth vote by hosting campaign events with young voters making endorsement speeches went viral online, and by promising to deliver speedy measures to increase housing supply in Seoul and also to look after the reinstatement and recovery of the victim of sexual harassment by the previous mayor Park Won-soon.

Results

Mayor of Busan

Primary

Democratic Party 
On 6 March 2021, Kim Young-choon won Democratic preselection for the Busan mayorship, defeating Byeon Sung-wan and Park In-young.

Candidates 
 Byeon Sung-wan, Acting Mayor of Busan
Kim Young-choon, Former Minister of Oceans and Fisheries
Park In-young, Former Speaker of the Busan Metropolitan Council

People Power Party 
On 4 March 2021, Park Heong-joon won PPP preselection for the Busan mayorship, defeating Park Seong-hun and Lee Un-ju.

Candidates 
 Park Min-sik, Former Member of the National Assembly
 Park Heong-joon, Former Professor of the Dong-a University
 Lee Un-ju, Former Member of the National Assembly
 Park Seong-hun, Former Vice Mayor of Busan

List of registered candidates

Results

Municipal Mayor

Mayor of Nam District, Ulsan

Mayor of Uiryeong County

Member of Metropolitan Council

Seoul Metropolitan Council

Gyeonggi Metropolitan Council

North Chungcheong Metropolitan Council

South Jeolla Metropolitan Council

South Gyeongsang Metropolitan Council

Member of Municipal Council

Seoul

Ulsan

Gyeonggi

South Chungcheong

North Jeolla

South Jeolla

South Gyeongsang

References 

2021
2021 elections in South Korea
April 2021 events in South Korea